The Mountain West Conference Women's Basketball Player of the Year is a basketball award given to the Mountain West Conference's (MW) most outstanding player. The award was first given following the 1999–2000 season, the first of the conference's existence. As of 2022, no MW player has received any national player of the year award.

Utah has the most awards with eight and individual recipients with five, but the Utes left the MW in 2011 to join what is now the Pac-12 Conference. Among current members, Colorado State and UNLV have the most awards with four each, and Colorado State has the most individual recipients with three. Two players have shared the award on five occasions—in 2001, consecutively from 2005 to 2007, and also in 2015. Three players have won the award more than once. Ellen Nystrom of Colorado State won in 2016 and 2017; Linda Fröhlich of UNLV won the award outright in 2000 and 2002 and shared it in 2001; and Kim Gaucher (née Smith) of Utah won four times—outright in 2003 and 2004, and shared in 2005 and 2006.

Key

Winners

Winners by school

Footnotes

References
 Winners through 2019–20: 

NCAA Division I women's basketball conference players of the year
Player of the Year
Awards established in 2000